Fuego en la sangre (Translated to "Fire in the Blood", but in English called Burning for Revenge) is a Mexican telenovela that began transmissions on January 21, 2008, through Mexico's Canal de las Estrellas network. Starring Adela Noriega, Eduardo Yáñez, Elizabeth Álvarez, Jorge Salinas, Nora Salinas and Pablo Montero.

It is the Mexican remake of the Colombian soap operas Las Aguas Mansas and Pasion de Gavilanes. The theme song called "Para Siempre" was composed by Joan Sebastian and sung by Vicente Fernández.

The telenovela received TVyNovelas Award for Best Telenovela, in 2009.

History
From January 21 to November 2, 2008, Canal de las Estrellas broadcast Fuego en la sangre weeknights at 9pm. From July 22, 2013 to February 7, 2014, Canal de las Estrellas broadcast reruns of Fuego en la sangre weekdays at 11:30am. As of April 18, 2016 - January 27, 2017 TL Novelas broadcast 11:00, 17:00 and 23:00 replacing Sortilegio. With Amores verdaderos replacing it the January 30.
From April 28, 2008 to February 20, 2009, Univision broadcast Fuego en la sangre weeknights at 9pm/8c replacing Pasión. The last episode was broadcast on February 20, 2009 with Mañana es para siempre replacing it February 23, 2009.

Plot summary

The plot of this story revolves around three brothers- Juan, Oscar and Franco Reyes, who swear an oath of allegiance on the tomb of their recently departed sister, Libia, to avenge her death.  Libia died under mysterious circumstances while she was involved in a passionate relationship with another man, the wealthy and influential Bernardo Elizondo, who has since also died, under mysterious circumstances.  The brothers discover that, not only was Elizondo married throughout his relationship with Libia, but he was also the father of three very beautiful, and very different, adult daughters.  Believing Libia's death to be directly related to her relationship with Elizondo, the brothers determine to infiltrate his life and wreak their vengeance on the lives of his survivors.  There, however, they discover that things are not as simple as they thought they would be.

Determined to ruin the household and, most especially, the lives of Don Bernardo’s daughters, they go to the Hacienda San Agustín, with the purpose of killing everyone in the family. They are confused and are thought to be the construction workers in charge of building a house for Sofia and Fernando. They go with the flow and enter the household undercover, yet they change their purpose once there they discover things are not necessarily what they seem.  They discover that Bernardo's three daughters are each of them unique, special, and determined women and that- most especially- they are all captives to their fierce, domineering, and manipulative mother, the pious and powerful Gabriela Acevedo.  As the brothers get to know each sister, the compassion they feel towards these women who each are fighting their own struggles against both their tyrannical mother, as well as their own budding femininity and individuality, gradually turns to passion.  And each brother is drawn to his own sister- the easy-going and carefree Oscar is drawn to Jimena, a fun-loving and passionate beauty aching to free herself from her controlling mother's devices.  The sensitive Franco is drawn to the bookish Sarita, both of whom have the brain of an intellectual and the soul of a poet.  And finally, Juan, the Alpha of the three brothers, is drawn to the sensitive and kind-hearted Sofia, who has perhaps the toughest lot of the three sisters as, having been raped by Fernando- a brutal and ambitious man with designs on the Elizando fortune- she is then forced by her mother to wed her rapist, under the guise of preserving the family honor (but, really, it is because the pious Gabriela lusts for Fernando herself, and has her own designs on him), and as such is now living in misery.

As the brothers become more enmeshed with the lives of these three women, each budding relationship brings its own problems and its own strife- forgotten lovers, ghosts from the past, emerging threats with their own agendas and, overshadowing all, the constant threat of the powerful Gabriela and the manipulative Fernando, who will stop at nothing to get what they want...

In the backdrop of this, there is a multitude of colorful secondary characters, each contributing their own bit to this fascinating puzzle- the exotic Rosario, the scheming Ruth, the haunted Eva, the world-weary Don Agustín, the tortured Padre Tadeo... each of them is a part of this fascinating, brutal, and thrilling story.

Cast

Soundtrack
Fuego en la sangre was released on CD in Mexico on November 14, 2008.
Track listing

Ratings

Mexico

DVD release
Fuego en la sangre was released in a 4 disc DVD set in Mexico in mid-2009. It contains all 200 episodes in abridged version. A 2 disc US version was released on September 1, 2009.

Awards and nominations

References

External links
 Fuego en la sangre at univision.com
 
 Best music themes from telenovelas  Aol Latino.

Mexican telenovelas
Televisa telenovelas
2008 telenovelas
2008 Mexican television series debuts
2008 Mexican television series endings
Rape in television
Mexican television series based on Colombian television series
Spanish-language telenovelas